Timothy S. Wheeler (born January 21, 1988) is a former outfielder.

Wheeler attended El Camino Fundamental High School in Sacramento, California. He was a two-sport athlete, playing in the outfield for the baseball team and playing quarterback and defensive back in football.

Wheeler played college baseball at Sacramento State University. In 2008, he played collegiate summer baseball with the Orleans Cardinals of the Cape Cod Baseball League and was named a league all-star. In 2009, he was named a second team All-American by Baseball America after hitting .385 with 18 home runs and 72 runs batted in.

Wheeler was drafted by the Colorado Rockies in the first round of the 2009 Major League Baseball Draft. Prior to the 2010 season, he was ranked as the Rockies' seventh best prospect by Baseball America. His best minor league season came in 2011 with the Class AA Tulsa squad. He hit 33 home runs that season.

Prior to the 2012 season, Baseball America rated him the Rockies' fifth best prospect. However, he suffered a fracture of the hamate bone in his right hand only a few days into the season. He missed significant time that season, finishing with a .303 batting average and 2 home runs in 92 games.

References

External links

1988 births
Living people
Sacramento State Hornets baseball players
Orleans Firebirds players
Tri-City Dust Devils players
Modesto Nuts players
Tulsa Drillers players
Salt River Rafters players
Colorado Springs Sky Sox players
Albuquerque Isotopes players
Baseball players from Sacramento, California
Players of American football from Sacramento, California